is a Japanese manga series by Nana Haruta. Stardust Wink was serialized in the monthly  manga magazine Ribon from the February 2009 issue to the February 2013 issue.

Plot
Anna Koshiro is childhood friends with Sou Nagase and Hinata Tokura, the most popular boys in school, and because of this, everyone assumes that she will date either of them eventually. Anna, however, wants to keep their relationship platonic, but the friendship between the three changes when Sou admits he's always been in love with her, while she comes to terms that she's in love with Hinata.

Characters

Main characters

 (vomic)
Anna is a middle school student who lives in room 302.

 (vomic)
Sou is Anna's childhood friend who lives in room 301. He is one of the most popular boys in their school and does well in academics and sports. He has been in love with Anna since they were children.

 (vomic)
Hinata is Anna's childhood friend who lives in room 303. He is one of the most popular boys in their school and is part of the Art Club.

Apartment residents

 (vomic)
Beni is a 6th grade student who is often mistaken for being older. She lives in room 501 and has a crush on Sou.

Mashiro is a college student and Beni's older brother. He acts as a confidant to Anna.

Rin is a college student and Sou's older sister.

Middle school classmates

 (vomic)
Hime is Anna's friend at school.

 (vomic)
Rui is Anna's friend at school.

 (vomic)
Enomoto is a third-year student who Anna initially dates before realizing she isn't in love with him.

Mochizuki is Anna's shy classmate and part of the Art Club. She is in love with Hinata.

Miss Kobayashi is the club advisor for the Art Club, who Anna discovers is misplacing her feelings on Hinata after being rejected by her ex-fiancé.

High school classmates

Nanoka is Anna's classmate and friend in high school. She holds a grudge against Sou for dating Ayane in middle school.

Ayane is Nanoka's beautiful childhood friend who dated Sou in middle school.

Kazami is Anna's classmate in high school who sits behind her. He is always sleeping because he works as a manga artist. He has been friends with Nanoka and Ayane since childhood.

Media

Manga

Stardust Wink is written and illustrated by Nana Haruta. It was serialized in the monthly  manga magazine Ribon from the February 2009 issue released on December 29, 2008, to the February 2013 issue released on December 28, 2012. The chapters were later released in 11 bound volumes by Shueisha under the Ribon Mascot Comics imprint. The first-press edition of each book came with a character file bookmark.

In 2010, Haruta published a spin-off side story in Margaret, which was later compiled in volume 6. During the series' run, a vomic (voice comic) was released on Shueisha's website on May 13, 2011, which adapted the first chapter. The vomic was also later released as a magazine gift on DVD with the June 2012 issue of Ribon on May 1, 2012. After the series' run, Haruta published another spin-off side story titled  in the 2013 Winter Daizōkan edition of Ribon Special, which focused on Mashiro and Rin, and was later published in volume 1 of Tsubasa to Hotaru.

Reception

Volume 3 debuted at #20 on Oricon and sold 32,848 copies in its first week. Volume 4 debuted at #23 on Oricon and sold 35,637 copies in its first week. Volume 5 debuted at #9 on Oricon and sold 29,919 copies in its first week. Volume 6 debuted at #13 on Oricon and sold 29,414 copies in its first week and 56,212 copies overall. Volume 7 debuted at #11 on Oricon and sold 29,580 copies in its first week. Volume 8 debuted at #16 on Oricon and sold 42,534 copies in its first week. Volume 9 debuted at #24 on Oricon and 30,549 copies in its first week. Volume 10 debuted at #24 on Oricon and sold 27,122 copies in its first week and 56,643 copies overall. Volume 11 debuted at #29 on Oricon and sold 43,226 copies in its first week.

References

External links

2008 manga
Shueisha manga
Shōjo manga